The 2019–20 Army Black Knights men's basketball team represented the United States Military Academy during the 2019–20 NCAA Division I men's basketball season. The Black Knights were led by fourth-year head coach Jimmy Allen, and played their home games at Christl Arena in West Point, New York as members of the Patriot League. They finished the season 15–15, 10–8 in Patriot League play to finish in a tie for fourth place. They lost in the quarterfinals of the Patriot League tournament to Lafayette.

Roster

Schedule and results

|-
!colspan=9 style=| Non-conference regular season

|-
!colspan=9 style=| Patriot League regular season

|-
!colspan=9 style=| Patriot League tournament
|-

Source

Notes

References

Army Black Knights men's basketball seasons
Army
Army Black Knights men's basketball
Army Black Knights men's basketball